Francis Martin Kelly (November 15, 1886 – June 24, 1950) was an American prelate of the Roman Catholic Church. He served as bishop of the Diocese of Winona in Minnesota from 1928 to 1949.

Early life 
Francis Kelly was born in Houston, Minnesota, to James and Ellen Kelly. His father sat in the Minnesota Legislature. After attending the College of St. Thomas in St. Paul, he earned a Bachelor of Philosophy degree from the Catholic University of America in Washington, D.C. (1909) and a Doctor of Sacred Theology degree from the Propaganda University in Rome (1913).

Priesthood 
Kelly was ordained to the priesthood for the Diocese of Winona by Archbishop Édouard-Charles Fabre in Montreal on November 1, 1912. He became secretary to Bishop Patrick Richard Heffron in 1914, and taught philosophy at St. Mary's College and St. Teresa's College between 1915 and 1926. He was chancellor of the diocese (1919–26) and vice-rector of St. Mary's College (1918–26).

Auxiliary Bishop and Bishop of Winona 
On March 22, 1926, Kelly was appointed auxiliary bishop of Winona and Titular Bishop of Mylasa by Pope Pius XI. He was consecrated on June 9, 1926. On February 10, 1928, Pius XI appointed Kelly as bishop of the diocese. 

He retired on October 17, 1949. Francis Kelly died in Rochester, Minnesota, on June 24, 1950.

References

1886 births
1950 deaths
People from Houston, Minnesota
Roman Catholic bishops of Winona
University of St. Thomas (Minnesota) alumni
Catholic University of America alumni
20th-century American Roman Catholic titular bishops